Note: The Little River of northeastern Indiana is also sometimes known as the Little Wabash River.

The Little Wabash River is a  tributary of the Wabash River in east-central and southeastern Illinois in the United States. Via the Wabash and Ohio rivers, it is part of the watershed of the Mississippi River. It is the third largest tributary after the White River and the Embarras River.

Course
The Little Wabash rises in Coles County near Mattoon and flows generally southwardly through Shelby, Effingham, Clay, Richland, Wayne, Edwards and White counties, past the towns of Louisville, Golden Gate, Carmi and New Haven.

In its upper course in Shelby County, the river is dammed to form Lake Mattoon and collects the short West Branch Little Wabash River, which flows for its entire length in Shelby County. Other tributaries include the Fox River, which joins it in Edwards County; the Elm River, which joins it in Wayne County; and the Skillet Fork, which joins it in White County.

See also
List of Illinois rivers
Watersheds of Illinois

References

Columbia Gazetteer of North America entry
DeLorme (2003). Illinois Atlas & Gazetteer. Yarmouth, Maine: DeLorme. .

Surfing the Little Wabash with USEPA

Rivers of Illinois
Tributaries of the Wabash River
Rivers of Coles County, Illinois
Rivers of Shelby County, Illinois
Rivers of Effingham County, Illinois
Rivers of Clay County, Illinois
Rivers of Richland County, Illinois
Rivers of Wayne County, Illinois
Rivers of Edwards County, Illinois
Rivers of White County, Illinois